Coccidiphila danilevskyi is a moth in the family Cosmopterigidae. It is found in France, Spain, Portugal, Morocco and Tunisia.

Adults are on wing from May to September in Europe. In North Africa, adults have been recorded in February (in Morocco) and from September to October (in Tunisia). There are probably two generations per year.

References

Moths described in 1997
Cosmopteriginae
Moths of Europe